Bhar Singh Pura is a village in Phillaur tehsil of Jalandhar District of Punjab State, India. It is located 10 km away from Phillaur. It is one of the medium-sized villages in Punjab. Almost one-third of the population of this village lives abroad. The outskirts of the village are lined with designers Kothies (Big Houses) built by the NRIs, who have a silent competition to show their worth. There is a full site of this village on Facebook. A number of people from this village have achieved remarkable positions in India as well abroad. NRIs have made a full-fledged gym in the village for the youth; still there are few users of the same as a number of young boys have indulged in taking of various drugs. The village has a Senior Secondary school and a good private-public school (Everlasting Convent School).

Caste 
The main castes in this village are Jats, Harijans, Goldsmith, Brahman, and Weavers etc. The village has schedule caste (SC) constitutes 60.22% of total population of the village and it doesn't have any Schedule Tribe (ST) population.

Famous people 
Surinder Singh Nijjar (Judge of the Supreme Court of India).
Ch Muhammad Jameel who became Member Provisional Assembly (Punjab, Pakistan) his family migrated at the time of Partition in 1947 to Pakistan, also belongs to Bhar Singh Pura. He is Arain (Jalandhar).
Mandip Nijor from the UK who specialises in e-commerce and software development in the UK.

World renowned Dhadi Jatha whose members are Dhadi Harbans Singh Josh , Dhadi Gurbachan Singh Ankhi and Sarangi Master Harmail Singh Dilbar these 3 brothers who now live in the U.K. have been awarded gold medals by the pind for their Seva for Sikhi

Navdeep Kaur Bassi, previously known as Navdeep Kaur Nijjar. From the UK specialised in Neonatal Care.

Nearby villages 
Apra
Bansian
Nagar
Thalla
Raipur
Dayalpur

References 

Villages in Jalandhar district